Frederick "Derrick" S. Pumaren, better known on his nickname Manong Derrick, is a Filipino basketball coach who was recently the coach of the De La Salle Green Archers in the University Athletic Association of the Philippines (UAAP). He coached several teams in the UAAP, PBA, and PBL.

Career

Playing career

Collegiate career
Pumaren was a member of the UE Red Warriors 1978 championship team.

Coaching career

Magnolia (PBL) head coach (1983–1990)
While being an assistant, Pumaren led the Magnolia to six Philippine Amateur Basketball League championship.

Assistant coach (1985–1989)
Pumaren was hired an assistant coach for San Miguel Beermen led by then import-coach Norman Black. But when the People Power Revolution occurred and the Beermen was left the league for a while, he worked for Tanduay Rhum Makers under coach Arturo Valenzona and won back-to-back championship in 1987, but lost in the third conference and spoiled their chance to swipe the prestigious Grand slam. He returned as an assistant coach in 1987. When Norman Black returned, this time as a full-time head coach, Pumaren helped the Beermen to win four championships, including the 1989 grand slam.

Magnolia head coach (1986)
In 1986, the Magnolia/SMB returned to the league in the last conference of the season, Pumaren was appointed as head coach, but placed last in the standings.

La Salle (1986–1991)
Pumaren became the head coach for the De La Salle Green Archers in the UAAP from 1986 to the early 90s, piloting the team to its first UAAP championship in 1989 and repeating in 1990. He also called the shots for the 1991 La Salle team in a controversial UAAP championship game win over FEU in 1991.

Philippine team (1989)
Pumaren led the Philippine team (RP-5) into a silver finish against Malaysia in 1989 Kuala Lumpur Southeast Asian Games.

Triple-V (1991–1992)
Pumaren led Triple-V Restaurant into three PABL championships.

Pepsi (1990–1994)
Pumaren was hired by Pepsi Hotshots to replace legendary PBA head coach Ed Ocampo. Pumaren led his team to a finals appearance in 1992 PBA Third Conference Finals as 7Up Uncolas, but swept by Swift.

Sunkist Orange Juicers and success (1995–1996)
Pumaren was hired as Swift Mighty Meaties/Hotdogs head coach. In 1995, Swift changed its name to Sunkist Orange Juicers and he led his team to two championships (defeating Alaska Milkmen in both finals series), but lost in the last conference. He won Coach of the Year (COY) Award in the same season. But in 1996, the success was not doubled, even assisted by legendary coach Turo Valenzona.

Co-coach at Mobiline (1997)
Pumaren was hired as co-coach for Mobiline Phone Pals with Tommy Manotoc. But their partnership did not bear any championship appearance.

Sta. Lucia Realtors (1998)
He replaced Chot Reyes as head coach of the Sta. Lucia Realtors. He led the team to a semi-finals appearance in 1998 PBA All-Filipino Cup.

Purefoods (1999–2000)
He replaced future PBA Commissioner Chito Narvasa as Purefoods head coach. One of the trades under him was trading away Defense Minister Jerry Codiñera to the Mobiline Phone Pals to get the 6'9 center Andy Seigle. In 2000, Pumaren led Purefoods to two finals appearances, first in All-Filipino Cup and the last was in the Governors' Cup.

Tanduay and FedEx (2001–2003)
He coached the Tanduay Rhum Masters on its last season in the league. When Lina acquired the team, Pumaren and some players are carried over to the FedEx team. In 2003, he was sacked and replaced by Bonnie Garcia.

Consultant for UE (2004–2008)
When his brother Dindo Pumaren was hired as head coach of UE Red Warriors, Pumaren was hired as team consultant. He helped the team to reach Final Four in 2004, 2005, 2006, and 2008. He also helped the team to got a 14-0 elimination sweep that gave them to chance to skip the Final Four and advance to the Finals in 2007, but got swept by the returning De La Salle Green Archers (who were suspended the previous year) in the finals led by their brother Franz Pumaren.

Talk 'N Text (2006–2008)
Pumaren was hired by Talk 'N Text Phone Pals in 2006 and led his team to 2007 PBA Fiesta Conference Finals, but lost to Alaska Aces led by Willie Miller. But after the finals appearance, they suffered some losses led to rumors of team management firing him and his staff, but after a meeting with the players, it was decided to defer the decision until after the next tournament, the 2008 PBA Fiesta Conference. He was later replaced by Chot Reyes.

Hong Kong (2008–2014) 
Pumaren served as team consultant to Hong Kong.

UE (2014–2017)
Pumaren was hired by UE Red Warriors as head coach, and led his team to a 4th seed playoff game against the eventual champions NU Bulldogs, but lost. UE struggled and did not qualify for the next seasons that led him to resign.

CEU Scorpions (2018–2019)
Pumaren was hired by CEU Scorpions as head coach, and led his team to a better performance in Universities and Colleges Basketball League, but once lost to Olivarez College in a semi-final game. In 2019 PBA D-League Aspirants' Cup, he led the Scorpions to be a great performing team, but lost to Ateneo Blue Eagles 3 games to 1.

Return to La Salle (2020–2022)
In 2020, he returns as head coach for the De La Salle Green Archers in the UAAP, replacing Gian Nazario.

Coaching record

Collegiate record

The Pumaren Family
 His father is Pilo Pumaren (Former UE Red Warrior), who also served as an assistant coach under Norman Black to the San Miguel Beermen. His father Pilo eventually became the head coach of the team in 1998. He also played for the UE Red Warriors.
 He has two younger brothers who were both PBA players whom he had coached: Franz Pumaren (former UE Pages), who played for the San Miguel Beermen and Mobiline Phone Pals, he later inherited Derrick's head coaching duties in the UAAP and the PBL. Franz would go on to win the most college basketball titles in the modern era (post-EDSA). The youngest brother is Dindo Pumaren, who played for and won multiple championships with the Purefoods TJ Hotdogs and Pepsi, former head coach of the UE Red Warriors and DLSU Green Archers in the UAAP. Dindo is considered one of the game's greatest point guards in the same breath as peers such as Olsen Racela and Ronnie Magsanoc.

References 

Filipino men's basketball coaches
Filipino men's basketball players
San Miguel Beermen coaches
Living people
UE Red Warriors basketball players
Year of birth missing (living people)
Tanduay Rhum Masters coaches
Philippines men's national basketball team coaches
TNT Tropang Giga coaches
Pop Cola Panthers coaches
Sta. Lucia Realtors coaches
Magnolia Hotshots coaches
Barako Bull Energy coaches
UE Red Warriors basketball coaches
De La Salle Green Archers basketball coaches